Madison Square Mall was a shopping mall in Huntsville, Alabama, United States. It was also the oldest extant enclosed shopping mall (after the Heart of Huntsville Mall closed) in the city until its closure in 2017. The mall was located on the corner of University Drive (US 72) and Research Park Boulevard (SR-255).

In late January 2017, the mall permanently closed after 32 years of operation. Demolition of the former mall began on February 6, 2017.  The property was redeveloped into MidCity District beginning in 2017.

History

Madison Square Mall opened on August 1, 1984, with anchors JCPenney, Parisian, Castner Knott, Pizitz, and a Sears which relocated from Heart of Huntsville Mall. Junior anchors included Yielding and Blach's. The opening day ceremonies were attended by the Miss America 1984 contestant, Suzette Charles, in her first public appearance as the successor to Vanessa Williams after she was forced to resign the title due to unauthorized publication of nude photographs. Over time, some of the anchors moved or were bought out by bigger companies. Blach's was closed by 1987 and replaced by The Limited and Victoria's Secret. Pizitz was acquired by Jackson, Mississippi-based McRae's in 1988 and renamed as such until McRae's was acquired by Charlotte, North Carolina-based Belk. Castner Knott was acquired in 1998 by Dillard's. Yielding closed their Madison Square Mall location around 1993.

For the next 10 years, the space was used by Castner Knott/Dillard's for their menswear. Until 2008, Steve & Barry's used the space. In 2007, Belk, after purchasing Parisian, moved its store from the former McRae's space to the much larger former Parisian space and renovated it to fit the Belk model. The former McRae's building remained vacant from then until the mall closed. Belk departed for Bridge Street Town Center in late 2014.

In addition to the in-line mall stores, several other businesses are located in the Madison Square complex, including a Holiday Inn hotel, a Steak 'n Shake restaurant, and a TouchStar Cinemas movie theater. Former businesses in the complex include Romano's Macaroni Grill and Lone Star Steakhouse & Saloon.

Madison Square Mall had been renovated twice since its opening, first in 1994 and again in 2006.

Decline & closure (2006-2017) 
In the years following the renovation of 2006, a decrease in foot traffic and an increased crime threat led to many tenants of the mall relocating to other locations.  A riot erupted in December 2012 over the new Nike Air Jordan; police had to use pepper spray to calm the situation. No arrests were made. In July 2014, a video surfaced online of a Belk employee attempting to fight off a shoplifter in the parking lot. In September 2015, a woman was robbed at gunpoint in the parking lot of the mall.

The pilot episode of the Food Network show, Food Court Wars was filmed at this mall. Kettle N' Spouts, the winner of the episode, received a year's worth of free rent in the mall that was valued at $100,000. Kettle N' Spouts closed only 6 months after the episode aired.

Madison Square Mall was owned by CBL & Associates Properties, Inc., until it was sold to The Grove Huntsville LLC for $5 million in late April 2015. The new owners intended to redevelop the property, despite struggles with the city of Huntsville against property owners Sears, JCPenney, and most notably TouchStar Cinemas, who started a petition on June 7, 2016 to prevent their property from being demolished. Not even 24 hours later, the petition achieved over 1,000 signatures. Huntsville's Director of Urban Development, Shane Davis, made a statement regarding this move, and confirmed that the theater would not be demolished, and instead the plans would be reworked around the property.

Madison Square Mall began liquidation in summer 2016. The last liquidation sale ended on January 8, 2017.

On November 28, 2016, Sears announced it would be closing on January 29, 2017, making it the last tenant or anchor to close in the mall. Sears also announced it would return to the MidCity Huntsville development that will replace Madison Square Mall in a smaller store. In December 2016, JCPenney announced it would close on January 28, 2017. It is unknown if JCPenney will remain in the Huntsville area.

With the closure of Sears and JCPenney, Madison Square Mall permanently closed on January 29, 2017.  Demolition of the former mall began on February 6, 2017.  The property is now the site of MidCity District. The last remnant of the mall, Touchstar's very own Madison Square 12 theater, closed its doors permanently on May 2nd, 2021, and was demolished months afterwards.

References

External links
Madison Square Mall (archived site)

Shopping malls in Huntsville, Alabama
Shopping malls established in 1984
Shopping malls disestablished in 2017
CBL Properties
2017 disestablishments in Alabama
Defunct shopping malls in the United States
Demolished shopping malls in the United States
Buildings and structures demolished in 2017
1984 establishments in Alabama